Richard Pratt may refer to:

 Richard Prat, Mayor of Canterbury, 1456–1457
 Richard Pratt (Ripon MP) (fl. 1563), English Member of Parliament
 Richard Henry Pratt (1840–1924), American general, founder of the Carlisle Indian Industrial School
 Richard Pratt (cricketer) (1896–1982), English cricketer for Derbyshire
 Richard Pratt (businessman) (1934–2009), Australian businessman
 Richie Pratt (1943–2015), American musician
 Richard L. Pratt Jr. (born 1953), American theologian
 Richard Pratt (priest) (born 1955), Church of England priest

See also
 Pratt (surname)